Irish Brigade may refer to:

Military units
 Irish Brigade (France), the Jacobite brigade in the French army, 1690–1792
 Irish Brigade (Spanish Civil War), organised by Eoin O'Duffy to fight for Franco's Nationalists
 Irish Brigade (Union Army), pro-Union Civil War brigade of Irish immigrants	
 Irish Brigade (World War I), unrealised pro-German brigade of Irishmen recruited among British Army POWs in Germany
 Irish expedition to Scotland, an Irish brigade fighting on the Royalist side in Scotland during the War of the Three Kingdoms
 Catholic Irish Brigade (1794–1798), a British Army unit
 Franco-Irish Ambulance Brigade (1870)
 Tyneside Irish Brigade, World War I British Army brigade of Irish immigrants in Newcastle upon Tyne
 30th Missouri Infantry Regiment, a Confederate brigade also known as Missouri Irish Brigade and Kelly's Irish Bridgade 
 A voluntary force under Myles O'Reilly that defended Rome in the Second Italian War of Independence; see

Other
 The Irish Brigade (band), an Irish punk rock group
 Independent Irish Party MPs in the House of Commons (1882–1914), were often described by opponents and supporters as the Irish Brigade

See also 
 North Irish Brigade, Infantry Depot M at Omagh
 Irish commandos, fought with the Boers during the Second Boer War (1899–1902)
 Irish Guards, a Foot Guards regiment of the British Army
 Irish Legion, raised by Napoleonic France in 1803-15
 Irish regiment, lists all such regiments in non-Irish armed forces
 London Irish Rifles Irish Regiment in the British Army
 Liverpool Irish Irish Regiment in the British Army